Bayt Atiq  is a Syrian village located in the Ayn Halaqim Subdistrict in Masyaf District, located southwest of Hama. According to the Syria Central Bureau of Statistics (CBS), Bayt Atiq had a population of 488 in the 2004 census. In the 1960s, it was described as a small village.

References

Bibliography

Populated places in Masyaf District